Soyuz MS-03 was a Soyuz spaceflight launched on 17 November 2016. It transported three members of the Expedition 50 crew to the International Space Station. MS-03 was the 132nd flight of a Soyuz spacecraft. The crew consisted of a Russian commander with American and French flight engineers.

Crew

Backup crew

Mission highlights 
Soyuz MS-03 launched with Expedition 50/51 on 17 November 2016, at 20:17 UTC. Astronaut Peggy Whitson, at age 56, became the oldest woman to fly into space. Soyuz MS-03 docked at the International Space Station on 19 November 2016. On 2 June 2017, Soyuz MS-03 undocked from the ISS, carrying Oleg Novitsky and Thomas Pesquet back to Earth after 196 days in space. Whitson remained on the ISS and returned on Soyuz MS-04 on 3 September 2017.

References 

Crewed Soyuz missions
Spacecraft launched in 2016
2016 in Russia
Spacecraft which reentered in 2017
Spacecraft launched by Soyuz-FG rockets
Fully civilian crewed orbital spaceflights